Congerstone is a village and former civil parish, now in the parish of Shackerstone, in the Hinckley and Bosworth district, in Leicestershire, England. It is three miles north west of Market Bosworth, of which it was historically a daughter parish. It is near the Ashby-de-la-Zouch Canal and the A444 road. In 1931 the parish had a population of 209.

The Grade II* listed parish church of St Mary the Virgin dates back to 1179, although the current building is largely from the 16th century and was remodelled in the 19th century.  The patron of the church was formerly the Curzon family of Earl Howe who also helped fund the village school.   The church includes the tomb of Georgiana, Countess Howe, first wife of Richard Curzon, 4th Earl Howe, with a monument by Sir George Frampton. 

The village has one school, Congerstone Primary School, on Shackerstone Road.

History 
The village's name derives from the Old English cyning-tūn meaning 'farm/settlement of a king'.

On 1 April 1935 the parish was abolished and merged with Shackerstone.

References 

Villages in Leicestershire
Former civil parishes in Leicestershire
Shackerstone